The Interdistrict Public School Choice Program is a program designed to expand educational choices for New Jersey students by providing them with the option of attending a school district outside their district of residence without cost to their parents and paid for by the state of New Jersey. Districts must apply to participate and must designate open seats by grade where they will accept non-resident students. Each year the New Jersey Department of Education selects the choice districts from those districts that have submitted an application.  For 2023-24 there will be 122 participating districts.

As the program has grown in enrollment, so have its costs.  What was a $9.8 million expense in 2010-11 grew into a $49 million expense by 2013-14.  In the fall of 2013, facing a tight state budget, the Christie Administration capped enrollment growth at 5% for the next year.  Advocates for Interdistrict Choice objected, with Mila Jasey calling the cap "ill-advised and short-sighted," but the cap has been allowed to stay in place.

Participating school districts
Atlantic County
Folsom Borough School District at Folsom Elementary School

Bergen County
Englewood Public School District at Dwight Morrow High School

Burlington County
Washington Township School District at Green Bank Elementary School

Camden County
Brooklawn Public School District

Cape May County
Lower Township School District

Cumberland County
Cumberland Regional High School

Gloucester County
South Harrison Township School District

Hudson County
Hoboken Public Schools

Hunterdon County
Bloomsbury School District

Monmouth County
Upper Freehold Regional School District at Allentown High School

Morris County
Mine Hill School District

Ocean County
Stafford Township School District

Passaic County
Manchester Regional High School

Salem County
Salem City School District

Union County
David Brearley High School, as part of the Kenilworth Public Schools

References

External links
Interdistrict Public School Choice Program (History)
Interdistrict Public School Choice Program (Official)

   

Public education in New Jersey
School districts in New Jersey